The Solitude of Compassion is a 1932 short story collection by the French writer Jean Giono. The stories focus on rural life in Provence. The book was published in English in 2002, translated by Edward Ford.

Stories

 The Solitude of Compassion (Solitude de la pitié)
 Prelude to Pan (Prélude de Pan)
 Fields (Champs)
 Ivan Ivanovitch Kossiakoff (Ivan Ivanovitch Kossiakoff)
 The Hand (La main)
 Annette or A Family Affair (Annette ou une affaire de famille)
 On the Side of the Road (Au bord des routes)
 Jofroi de Maussan (Jofroi de la Maussan)
 Philmon (Philémon)
 Joselet
 Sylvie
 Babeau
 The Sheep (Le mouton)
 In the Land of the Tree Cutters (Au pays des coupeurs d'arbres)
 The Great Fence (La grande barrière)
 The Destruction of Paris (Destruction de Paris)
 Magnetism (Magnétisme)
 Fear of the Land (Peur de la terre)
 Lost Rafts (Radeaux perdus)
 Song of the World (Le chant du monde)

Reception
Kirkus Reviews wrote in 2002: "Although most of the pieces here, first published in France in 1932, are set in the hamlets and countryside of Provence, they bring us into a world that is dark, spiteful, and lugubrious: a world of hard-hearted peasants bent on squeezing the life out of their neighbors much as they squeeze oil from their olives. ... Like Faulkner, Giono takes us into an unpleasant world shot through with strange and unexpected beauty."

Adaptations
The story "Jofroi de Maussan" was the basis for the 1934 film Jofroi directed by Marcel Pagnol. Between 1987 and 1990, France 2 made a series of six Giono adaptations under the title L'ami Giono, of which three were based on stories from The Solitude of Compassion: Jofroi de la Maussan (1987), Solitude de la pitié (1988) and Ivan Ivanovitch Kossiakoff (1990).

References

External links
 Publicity page at Éditions Gallimard's website 

1932 short story collections
Books adapted into films
French-language books
French short story collections
Works by Jean Giono